Karapolat is a village in the Yedisu District, Bingöl Province, Turkey. The village is populated by Circassians and had a population of 32 in 2021.

The hamlet of Yukarı Karabolat is attached to the village.

References 

Villages in Yedisu District